Cox Enterprises, Inc. is a privately held global conglomerate headquartered in Atlanta, Georgia, United States, with approximately 55,000 employees and $21 billion in total revenue. Its major operating subsidiaries are Cox Communications and Cox Automotive. The company's major national brands include AutoTrader, Kelley Blue Book, Manheim Auctions and more.

Through Cox Automotive, the company's international operations stretch across Asia, Australia, Europe and Latin America. Cox Enterprises is currently led by Alexander C. Taylor, a fourth-generation Cox family member and great-grandson of founder James M. Cox. James M. Cox's grandson, James C. Kennedy, and other members of the Cox family are on the company's board of directors.

On March 2, 2020, the sale of Cox Media Group's Ohio newspapers was finalized back to Cox Enterprises, and subsequently formed Cox First Media. This move was to ensure the publications would remain daily newspapers serving the southwest Ohio region.

History

Founding

The company was founded in Dayton, Ohio by James M. Cox, who purchased the Dayton Daily News in 1898. Cox became a member of Ohio's delegation to the United States House of Representatives and then the Governor of Ohio. He was the Democratic Party candidate for president of the United States in the presidential election of 1920, running unsuccessfully on a ticket that included Franklin D. Roosevelt as the vice presidential candidate.

Telecommunications
Years later and at the urging of Governor Cox’s son, James M. Cox Jr., Cox entered the radio business, starting with WHIO in Dayton in 1935. Governor Cox purchased the Atlanta Journal in 1939 as well as radio station WSB. On September 29, 1948, Cox's WSB-TV, later referred to as the "Eyes of the South", aired the first television broadcast in Atlanta. WHIO-TV in Ohio's Miami Valley soon followed, airing its first broadcasts on February 23, 1949.

In 1950, Governor Cox purchased The Atlanta Constitution, and in 1962 his son purchased three cable television systems in central Pennsylvania with a total of 11,800 subscribers. The two combined their broadcasting and cable businesses into the publicly-traded Cox Broadcasting Corporation (CBC) in 1964, though the newspaper business remained independent as Cox Enterprises. As the cable business expanded, it was eventually consolidated and spun off into the new privately-owned Cox Cable Communications (CCC) in 1968, which quickly became the second-largest cable TV company. Upon Jim Cox Jr.’s death in 1974, he left his two sisters, Anne Cox Chambers and Barbara Cox, in control of 95% of the privately-owned company.

In 1982, CBC moved its headquarters to the Atlanta area and changed its name to Cox Communications, Inc. The company was eventually consolidated into Cox Enterprises. In 1988 then-Executive Vice President Jim Kennedy, grandson of Governor Cox, was promoted to CEO and chairman of Cox Enterprises.

In 1986, Cox Enterprises launched a new subsidiary Cox Video, which lined up eleven commitments for original video programs, four of them came from Media Home Entertainment, which are comedy-based tapes and seven of them came from Fox Hills Video, which are reality-based tapes, both subsidiaries of Heron Communications, and co-production budgets involve a total of $1.5 million, and the Cox Video unit has also acquired the rights to produce video adaptations of the magazines and exercise regulations of Joe Weider, which included Muscle & Fitness, Flex and Men's Fitness & Shape, and Peter Bieler acting as executive producer on tapes produced by Cox Video, which also served as executive vice president of the studio, and the company is planning on to do regular releases that sometimes make use of the magazine's names and will be positioned as companions to Wieder's widely-distributed equipment, and the MHE comedies ranked at the $100,000 range and the Fox Hills tapes ranked at the $100,000 range.

Over the ensuing decades, Cox made pioneering investments and became the first company to bundle telephone, highspeed internet and digital cable television over a single broadband network.

Automotive
Cox entered the automotive industry in 1965 with the purchase of Black Book. Three years later, Manheim was purchased by Cox as well. The 1980s saw Manheim acquire its first non-U.S. auction in Toronto, Canada, making Cox an international company. In 1999, Autotrader.com was founded revolutionizing the way people buy and sell used cars. In 2014, Cox Enterprises brought its automotive-related businesses (which by then included vAuto and NextGear Capital) together under the Cox Automotive name.

Subsidiaries

Cox Communications

Cox Communications is the third-largest U.S. cable company, serving approximately 6 million residences and businesses. It provides advanced digital video, Internet, telephone and home security and automation services over its own nationwide IP network.

Cox Communications formed an alliance with the Cleveland Clinic to take Healthcare to the home in February 2015. The company has also been deploying residential gigabit internet service.

In 2019, Cox Communications earned the No. 11 spot on the 2019 DiversityInc Top 50 Companies for Diversity list. This marks the fourteenth time the company has been recognized among the nation’s corporate diversity leaders.

Cox Automotive

Cox Automotive is a provider of "vehicle remarketing services and digital marketing and software for automotive dealers and consumers." Cox Automotive brands include Manheim, Clutch Technologies, Dealer-Auction Ltd, AutoTrader, Kelley Blue Book, vAuto, Dealer.com, Dealertrack, NextGear Capital, Xtime, Vinsolutions, Dickinson Fleet Services, FleetNet America, and a host of global businesses and brands serving auto dealers, manufacturers and financial institutions.

Cox Media Group

Cox Media Group (CMG) is an integrated broadcasting, publishing, direct marketing and digital media company.

In 2019, Cox Enterprises reached an agreement with Apollo Global Management to sell a majority interest in Cox Media Group's broadcast television stations, including the company's radio, newspaper, and TV properties in Ohio, and its local OTT advertising subsidiary – Gamut. Smart Media from Cox. based in New York. On February 10, 2020, Cox Enterprises bought back the Ohio newspapers it sold to Apollo Global Management after the FCC required Apollo to reduce the daily newspapers to 3-day publication or sell them. Cox announced the newspapers would continue 7-day publication.

The Atlanta Journal-Constitution, in addition to the media agency Ideabar, will continue to be part of Cox Enterprises.

Gamut

Gamut is a subsidiary of CMG known for its work in local, over-the-top (OTT) video advertising solutions, whereas CMG focuses on linear television and radio. Based in New York, NY, in the same building as CMG, Gamut has eight offices in the US. Gamut’s proprietary technology, Gamut TOTAL, places OTT advertising campaigns directly in publishers' ad servers, including Discovery Inc.’s networks.

Cox Conserves
Cox Conserves is the company’s national sustainability program that focuses on alternative energy, community investment, employee engagement, energy conservation, waste diversion, recycling, and water conservation.

Since its launch in 2007, Cox Enterprises has invested more than $120 million in over 400 sustainability and conservation projects through Cox Conserves to drive positive environmental change within the organization, among stakeholders, and within the communities being served. According to its public statements, its primary focus areas include:

 Energy and water conservation 
 Waste diversion & recycling 
 Community engagement

Investments
In September 2019, Cox Automotive's Mobility Division entered into an agreement with Rivian, the company developing the first luxury all-electric truck. In the deal, Cox will invest $350 million into Rivian, with the two companies exploring partnership opportunities in service operations, logistics, and digital retailing.

In August 2022, Cox Enterprises agreed to acquire Axios Media, with the deal being valued at $525 million.

References

External links

 

 
Cable television companies of the United States
Companies based in Ohio
Companies based in Dayton, Ohio
Companies based in Atlanta
Privately held companies of the United States
Cox family
Telecommunications companies of the United States
Privately held companies based in Georgia (U.S. state)
Mass media companies established in 1898
Telecommunications companies established in 1898
American companies established in 1898
1898 establishments in Ohio
Conglomerate companies of the United States
Family-owned companies of the United States